Fernando Arlete (born 11 October 1968) is a Bissau-Guinean middle-distance runner. He competed in the men's 800 metres at the 1996 Summer Olympics.

References

External links
 

1968 births
Living people
Athletes (track and field) at the 1996 Summer Olympics
Bissau-Guinean male middle-distance runners
Olympic athletes of Guinea-Bissau
Place of birth missing (living people)